Nadeem–Shravan were an Indian music directors duo in the Bollywood film industry of India. They derives its name from their first names as, Nadeem Akhtar Saifi (born 6 August 1954) and Shravan Kumar Rathod (13 November 1954 – 22 April 2021).

Nadeem–Shravan were the most successful Bollywood music directors of the 1990s until the early 2000s. They displayed a strong influence of Hindustani (classical / semi-classical) music in their compositions, and were the only composers during the 1990s and 2000s who relied heavily on three particular instruments: the bansuri, the sitar and the shehnai in almost all of their songs. By using these instruments in a modern way without disconnecting them from their original value, their contribution is unique compared to some rising music directors evolving a new music style beginning in the mid-1990s. They are considered one of the most successful and greatest music composers in Hindi cinema history.

Their breakthrough soundtrack album was Aashiqui (1990), which sold 20 million units in India, and became the best-selling Bollywood soundtrack album of all time. Nadeem–Shravan were also behind many of the other best-selling Bollywood soundtrack albums of the 1990s. Their success helped establish the music label T-Series. The duo's career temporarily came to a halt with the murder of T-Series founder Gulshan Kumar by Mumbai underworld syndicate D-Company, with Nadeem Akhtar Saifi initially accused of involvement, before later being exonerated. The duo eventually made a comeback in the 2000s.

Nadeem–Shravan composed soundtracks for many Hindi films, including Aashiqui (1990), Saajan (1991), Phool Aur Kaante (1991), Sadak (1991), Deewana (1992), Dil Hai Ke Manta Nahin (1992), Dil Ka Kya Kasoor (1992), Sapne Sajan Ke (1992), Damini (1993), Hum Hain Rahi Pyar Ke (1993),  Rang (1993), Dilwale (1994), Aatish: Feel the Fire (1994), Salaami (1994), Raja (1995), Barsaat (1995), Agni Sakshi (1996), Jeet (1996), Raja Hindustani (1996), Pardes (1997), Judaai (1997), Naseeb (1998), Maharaja (1998), Aa Ab Laut Chalen (1999), Sirf Tum (1999), Dhadkan (2000), Kasoor (2000), Hum Ho Gaye Aapke (2001), Yeh Dil Aashiqanaa (2001), Raaz (2002), Dil Hai Tumhaara (2002), Dil Ka Rishta (2003), Andaaz (2003), Qayamat: City Under Threat (2003), Tumsa Nahi Dekha (2004) and Bewafaa (2005), among others.

Their most commonly featured and favorite singers include "Trimurti" Kumar Sanu, Alka Yagnik, Udit Narayan but other Hindi playback singers like Anuradha Paudwal, Kavita Krishnamurthy, Sonu Nigam Sadhana Sargam, Poornima, Jaspinder Narula, K. S. Chithra, S. P. Balasubrahmanyam, Hariharan, Suresh Wadkar, Pankaj Udhas, Mohammed Aziz, Sudesh Bhosle, Shailendra Singh, Shabbir Kumar, Nitin Mukesh, Roop Kumar Rathod, Vinod Rathod, Abhijeet, Sonu Nigam, Shaan, KK, Gurdas Maan, Shankar Mahadevan, Babul Supriyo, Manhar Udhas, Bali Brahmbhatt, Jolly Mukherjee, Sapna Mukherjee, Alisha Chinoy, Anwar, Vijay Benedict, Mukul Agrawal, Vipin Sachdeva, Sunanda
and many others have sung under their baton. Veteran singer Mohammed Rafi also sang for them in their film Dangal and Kishore Kumar in the film Ilaaka. Singers Lata Mangeshkar and Asha Bhosle also sang in few albums for the duo.

Music career

The association of Nadeem Akhtar Saifi and Shravan dates back to 1973 when they met each other at a function. Their first film assignment was Dangal, a Bhojpuri movie in 1973 (released in 1977) which featured the popular Bhojpuri song "Kashi hile, Patna hile" sung by Manna Dey. Their first Hindi movie assignment was Maine Jeena Seekh Liya in 1981 sung by Amit Kumar. In 1985, the duo composed music for a commercial project called Star Ten. Ten Hindi actors (Mithun, Jackie Shroff, Anil Kapoor, Sachin, Danny, Vijendra, Sulakshana Pandit, etc.) sang some songs with lyrics by Anwar Saagar. All the while, they struggled to get work and rarely did they get to compose the music for a full film. They suddenly found work, and in 1989, two big movies were released: Ilaaka, Hisaab Khoon Ka.  All of these films flopped at the box office and the music was rejected by audiences and critics alike.

Early success
Their breakthrough film, Aashiqui (1990), which brought them into the limelight, was gifted to them by none other than Gulshan Kumar. Aashiqui has been rated the 4th best soundtrack ever by Planet Bollywood on their "100 Greatest Bollywood Soundtracks". The soundtrack album sold 20 million units, making it the best-selling Bollywood soundtrack album of all time.

Their success continued with Saajan, Dil Hai Ki Manta Nahin, Sadak, Sainik, Raja, Dilwale, Raja Hindustani and Phool Aur Kaante. Whether it was "Chehra Kya Dekhte Ho" (Salaami), "Adayein Bhi Hain" (Dil Hai Ke Manta Nahin) "Sochenge Tumhe Pyar" (Deewana), "Tujhe Na Dekhu Toh Chain" (Rang), they all had the distinct stamp of Nadeem–Shravan.

Most of their compositions fall under the filmi-ghazal genre, as they were greatly inspired by ghazal music, and Classical music.

When Pardes soundtrack was released, the tracks had different varieties of songs; songs ("I Love My India" and "Meri Mehbooba"), love songs ("Do Dil Mil Rahe Hain") and qawwali ("Nahin Hona Tha)" pop ("My first day in America"), pain ("Ye Dil Deewana"). Planet Bollywood started the review by saying, "The music for Pardes is Nadeem-Shravan's best ever."

They have worked with lyricists like Sameer, Anand Bakshi, Faaiz Anwar, Hasrat Jaipuri, Rani Malik and many others. When they arrived on the music scene, Laxmikant–Pyarelal and Anand–Milind were at the top. But subsequently their hard work paid off and they had various hits in a row.

Their songs often contain Jhankaar, Conga, Bongos, Electronic drum fusion beats. They have insisted on sticking to lyricist Sameer and male singers Kumar Sanu, Udit Narayan and female singer Alka Yagnik for most of their compositions.

Other soundtracks by them include Saajan (16), Sadak (51), Raja Hindustani (56), Dhadkan (73), Deewana (79).

Gulshan Kumar murder case
Gulshan Kumar, the owner of T-Series, was shot dead outside the Jeeteshwar Mahadev Mandir, a Hindu mandir dedicated to Lord Shiva of which he attended daily in Jeet Nagar, Andheri West suburb of Mumbai, on 12 August 1997. Mumbai underworld organization D-Company was involved with the murder. The police also accused Nadeem Saifi of having paid for the murder due to a personal dispute and fled the country after the murder. According to the police, Nadeem hatched the conspiracy in Dubai in May with Anees Ibrahim Kaskar, the brother of fugitive gangster Dawood Ibrahim Kaskar and Dawood's associates Abu Salem and Kayyum. Crime branch sources said Nadeem has been out of Bombay since Gulshan Kumar died. During the interrogation of the arrested gangsters, the police reportedly learned that Nadeem had organized a "secret" music function in June for Dawood Ibrahim Kaskar in Dubai. Many well-known Bollywood personalities, the police claim, were present.

After the police's allegations against him, Nadeem Saifi had fled to the United Kingdom. In 2001, the case was taken to the London High Court, which rejected the Indian government's request for extradition on the grounds that there was no prima facie case against Saifi. In August 2001, the prosecution's main witness, Mohammed Ali Hussain Shaikh, who had earlier claimed Saifi participated in the murder, eventually revealed that he didn't know Saifi and had never seen him. Abu Salem also denied Nadeem's involvement on Indian national television. Saifi was also exonerated by four courts, including the House of Lords in the United Kingdom and the sessions court in Mumbai. Saifi eventually acquired British citizenship, and later moved to Dubai, where he runs a successful perfumery business.

Later years
After being inactive for sometime, Nadeem–Shravan made a comeback of sorts with Yeh Dil Aashiqanaa, Ek Rishta, Kasoor, Hum Ho Gaye Aapke, Raaz, Dil Hai Tumhaara, Qayamat, Hungama, Andaaz, Bewafaa, Tumsa Nahin Dekha: A Love Story, Barsaat, Dosti and Do Knot Disturb.

Nadeem remained in the UK and despite the distance between England and India, he and Shravan continued to make music together. But they later split after Dosti: Friends Forever.

Split
In 2005, the duo split, but came back for Do Knot Disturb, which was their last movie together. Nadeem started his own perfume and bag company and was also involved in solo compositions. Shravan was uninterested in continuing with his music and instead focused on the music careers of his sons (Sanjeev–Darshan) and movie production. Another reason cited is probably the growing distance between the two. In an interview, Nadeem stated that there wasn't any conflict between him and Shravan. In late 2013 it was announced that the duo would work together again on the sequel of Deewana but they later split due to personal conflicts again as a result of which Nadeem decided to return as a solo composer for Ishq Forever in 2015 but it did not become a hit because of less promotion and also because the quality of Udit Narayan, Kumar Sanu and Alka Yagnik was missing from his tunes.

Comeback of Nadeem Saifi
In 2016, Nadeem Saifi-Akhtar made his comeback with lyricist Sameer in the film Ishq Forever. He had split with his partner Shravan and worked on the film as a solo composer. The film features ten songs. In the year 2017 he continued his musical career in the film Ek Haseena Thi Ek Deewana Tha as a solo composer and film is produced and directed by Suneel Darshan.

Death of Shravan
On 22 April 2021, Shravan died of COVID-19 after being hospitalized days before in critical condition, in Hinduja Hospital. His son and wife were admitted to another medical facility in the city.

Awards

Nadeem–Shravan have won several awards during their music career.
 1991 – Filmfare Best Music Director Award – Aashiqui 1992 – Filmfare Best Music Director Award – Saajan 1993 – Filmfare Best Music Director Award – Deewana 1996 – Special Award London (UK) For Movie Raja – Raja 1997 – Filmfare Best Music Director Award – Raja Hindustani 1997 – Star Screen Best Music Director Award – Raja Hindustani 1998 – Star Screen Best Music Director Award – Pardes 2003 – Zee Cine Best Music Director – RaazNominations
 1992 – Filmfare Best Music Director Award – Phool Aur Kaante 1994 – Filmfare Best Music Director Award – Hum Hain Rahi Pyar Ke 1996 – Filmfare Best Music Director Award – Raja 1998 – Filmfare Best Music Director Award – Pardes 2001 – Filmfare Best Music Director Award – Dhadkan 2001– Star Screen Best Music Director Award – Dhadkan 2001– IIFA Best Music Director – Dhadkan 2003– Filmfare Best Music Director Award – Raaz 2004– Zee Cine Best Music Director – Andaaz''

Filmography

Music albums

Single(s) 

Jahan Base Dil (2022)

Impact on record sales
In total span of 17 years only 4 years (1998, 1999, 2004, 2006) are such which don't have Nadeem–Shravan album in top 3. The yearly analysis is as follows:

Soundtrack album sales
The following table lists the sales of Nadeem–Shravan's top-selling Bollywood music soundtrack albums in India. By 1993, their soundtrack albums had earned  in sales.

See also 
 List of Indian film music directors

References

External links
 
 
 

Filmfare Awards winners
Songwriting teams
Hindi film score composers
Bollywood playback singers
Indian musical duos